Keep it Up is the third studio album released by the Canadian rock band Loverboy in late June 1983. With new hit tracks like "Hot Girls in Love", the album became an instant hit, and reached #7 on the US Billboard 200 charts, as did the previous album released by the band.

Track listing

Personnel
All information from the album booklet.

Loverboy
 Mike Reno – lead vocals
 Paul Dean – guitar, backing vocals, producer
 Doug Johnson – keyboards
 Scott Smith – bass 
 Matt Frenette – drums

Additional musicians
 Nancy Nash – backing vocals on "It's Never Easy"

Production
 Paul Dean – producer
 Bruce Fairbairn – producer
 Lindsay Kidd – engineer
 Mike Fraser – engineer
 Dave Ogilvie – engineer
 Bob Rock – engineer, mixing
 Keith Stein – engineer, recording
 George Marino – mastering
 Jean Piché – programming

Charts

Certifications

References 

Loverboy albums
1983 albums
Albums produced by Bruce Fairbairn
Columbia Records albums